Marvin Doecadez Sonsona (born July 25, 1990) is a Filipino professional boxer and former WBO super flyweight champion. A relative of his named Eden Sonsona is also a boxer and a former Philippine national bantamweight champion. One of Sonsona's trainers is Nonito Donaire Sr., father and trainer of Nonito Donaire.

Professional career
Sonsona started boxing at seven years of age under the tutelage of his uncle. Before fighting as a professional, he fought 150 times as an amateur.

He won his professional debut on points then knocked out his next ten opponents in short rounds. All his first opponents were unknowns but then he also knocked out former two time WBC world Champion Thai fighter Wandee Singwancha (record 57-10) via second-round KO.

Sonsona climbed up in weight to challenge José López for the WBO super flyweight title on September 5, 2009. He scored a knockdown in the fourth round and fought his way to a unanimous decision victory.

On November 20, 2009, Sonsona vacated his newly won WBO super flyweight title after not being able to make the weight limit for his first title defense. The bout still went on with the WBO title at stake but only his challenger, Alejandro Mutchuneli (22-7-1), had the chance to win. At the end of the bout, the judges had it a split decision. With the result, Sonsona set a record for the Philippine boxer who had the shortest reign as world champion: 2 months and 17 days.

On February 27, 2010, Sonsona jumped two weight divisions, challenging undefeated Wilfredo Vázquez, Jr. for the vacant WBO super-bantamweight title. Vázquez, son of former world champion Wilfredo Vázquez, defeated Sonsona by knockout in the fourth round.

On October 15, 2011 Sonsona finally back in action facing Carlos Jakolmo, Sonsona sent the Mexican boxer to the canvass during the 8th round and He defeated Jakolmo via Unanimous Decision.

Sonsona claimed a 5th round KO victory against Dominican Republic's Carlos “El Burito” Fulgencio in the main event Pinoy Knockout 1 at the Hoops Dome in Lapu-Lapu City, Cebu, Philippines on March 17, 2012.  Sonsona has assured himself of a slot in the undercard of Johnriel Casimero's IBF Interim light flyweight title defense against Mexico’s Sammy Gutierrez on May 13, 2012 at the Waterfront Cebu City Hotel.

Professional boxing record

See also 
List of Filipino boxing world champions
List of WBO world champions
List of super flyweight boxing champions

References

External links

1990 births
Super-flyweight boxers
Flyweight boxers
Living people
Sportspeople from General Santos
Boxers from South Cotabato
Southpaw boxers
World boxing champions
World Boxing Organization champions
World super-flyweight boxing champions
Filipino male boxers